Edward Marsh (February 12, 1874 in Philadelphia – October 10, 1932 in Philadelphia) was an American rower who competed in the 1900 Summer Olympics.

A member of the Penn Athletic Club Rowing Association in Philadelphia, he was part of the American boat Vesper Boat Club, which won the gold medal in the eights. He was a member of the Theta Delta Chi Fraternity.

References

External links
 
 
 The History of the Penn Athletic Club Rowing Association

1874 births
1932 deaths
Rowers from Philadelphia
Rowers at the 1900 Summer Olympics
Olympic gold medalists for the United States in rowing
American male rowers
Medalists at the 1900 Summer Olympics
Lehigh University alumni